Aleksander Heintalu (also known as Vigala Sass; until 1974, Aleksander Rassadkin; 31 May 1941 – 19 August 2015) was an Estonian agriculturist. He was more known by his practices in alternative medicine.

He was born in Tartu. In 1981 he graduated from Estonian Agricultural Academy.

He had examined herbs in Siberia and Far East.

Works
 Kuldjuure (Rhodiola rosea L.) agrotehnika Eesti NSV-s (1988)
 Minu raviraamat (series, 1991–1993)
 Estide (tšuudide) hingestatud ilm (2001)
 Sassi raviraamat (2003)
 Taimeravi põhitõed (2005)
 Estide (tšuudide) hingestatud ilm II (2007)

References

Living people
1941 births
2015 deaths
Estonian esotericists
Estonian scientists
People from Tartu
Estonian University of Life Sciences alumni